Albiac is the name of the following communes in France:

 Albiac, Haute-Garonne, in the Haute-Garonne department
 Albiac, Lot, in the Lot department